Jessy Druyts (born 22 January 1994) is a Belgian professional racing cyclist, who most recently rode for UCI Women's Continental Team .

Druyts is from a sporting family: her father, Ronny, played youth football with Beerschot AC and at the senior level with Dynamo Niel, where he was a champion in the Belgian Provincial leagues, her sister Steffy was a multiple national champion in gymnastics, and she is the sister of racing cyclists Kelly Druyts, Demmy Druyts, Lenny Druyts and Gerry Druyts.

See also
 List of 2015 UCI Women's Teams and riders

References

External links

1994 births
Living people
Belgian female cyclists
Place of birth missing (living people)
People from Wilrijk
Cyclists from Antwerp
21st-century Belgian women